The following outline is provided as an overview of and topical guide to the Maldives:

The Maldives – island nation comprising a group of atolls in the Indian Ocean.  The Maldives is located south of India's Lakshadweep islands, and about seven hundred kilometres (435 mi) south-west of Sri Lanka. The twenty-six atolls of Maldives' encompass a territory featuring 1,192 islets, two hundred and fifty islands of which are inhabited.

The name "Maldives" may derive from Maale Dhivehi Raajje ("The Island Kingdom [under the authority of] Malé")." Some scholars believe that the name "Maldives" derives from the Sanskrit maladvipa, meaning "garland of islands", but this name is not found in ancient Sanskrit literature. Instead, classical Sanskrit texts mention the "Hundred Thousand Islands" (Lakshadweepa). Another theory suggests that the name "Maldives" derives from the Tamil "malai tivu" meaning "island of hills." Some medieval Arab travellers such as Ibn Batuta called the islands "Mahal Dibiyat" from the Arabic word Mahal ("palace")." This is the name presently inscribed in the scroll of the Maldive state emblem.

The religion original settlers of the islands is most likely to be Hinduism. Then around Ashoka's period, in the 3rd century BC, they converted to Buddhism. Islam was introduced in 1153. The Maldives came then under the influence of the Portuguese (1558) and the Dutch (1654) seaborne empires, and in 1887 it became a British protectorate. In 1965, the Maldives obtained independence from Britain (originally under the name "Maldive Islands"), and in 1968 the Sultanate was replaced by a Republic.

The Maldives is the smallest Asian country in terms of population and area. It is also the smallest entirely Muslim nation in the world.

General reference 

 Pronunciation: /ˈmɔːldiːvs/,/ˈmɒldiːvs/,/ˈmɔːldaɪvs/
 Common English country name:  Maldives
 Official English country name:  The Republic of Maldives
 Common endonym(s): Rajje , Dhivehi rajje 
 Official endonym(s): Dhivehiraajjeyge Jumhooriyya ދިވެހިރާއްޖޭގެ ޖުމްހޫރިއްޔާ 
 Adjectival(s): Maldivian
 Demonym(s): Maldivians
 ISO country codes:  MV, MDV, 462
 ISO region codes:  See ISO 3166-2:MV
 Internet country code top-level domain:  .mv

Geography of Maldives 

Geography of Maldives
 Maldives is: an island country
 Location:
 Northern Hemisphere and Eastern Hemisphere
 Indian Ocean
 between the Arabian Sea and the Laccadive Sea
 Eurasia
 Asia
 South Asia
 Indian subcontinent (off the coast of India, rising above the oceanic crust)
 Time zone:  UTC+05
 Extreme points of Maldives:
 High:  unnamed location on Villingili  – lowest high point of any country
 Low:  Indian Ocean 0 m
 Land boundaries:  none
 Coastline:  Indian Ocean 644 km
 Population of Maldives: 306,000  - 171st most populous country
 Area of Maldives: 298 km2
 Atlas of Maldives

Environment of Maldives 

 Climate of Maldives
 Wildlife of Maldives
 Birds of Maldives

Natural geographic features of Maldives 

 Glaciers of Maldives: None
 Islands of Maldives
 Mountains of Maldives: None
 World Heritage Sites in Maldives: None

Regions of Maldives

Ecoregions of Maldives

Administrative divisions of Maldives 

Haa Alifu Atoll
Haa Dhaalu Atoll
Shaviyani Atoll
Noonu Atoll
Raa Atoll
Baa Atoll
Lhaviyani Atoll
Kaafu Atoll
Alifu Atoll
Vaavu Atoll
Meemu Atoll
Faafu Atoll
Dhaalu Atoll
Thaa Atoll
Laamu Atoll
Gaafu Alifu Atoll
Gaafu Dhaalu Atoll
Gnaviyani Atoll
Seenu Atoll

Municipalities of Maldives 

Municipalities of Maldives
 Capital of Maldives: Malé
 Cities of Maldives

Demography of Maldives 

Demographics of Maldives

Government and politics of Maldives 

Politics of Maldives
 Form of government: Unitary presidential constitutional republic
 Capital of Maldives: Malé
 Elections in Maldives
 Political parties in Maldives

Branches of the government of Maldives 

Government of Maldives

Executive branch of the government of Maldives 
 Head of state: President of Maldives,
 Head of government: President of Maldives,

Legislative branch of the government of Maldives 

 Parliament of Maldives (bicameral)
 Upper house: Senate of Maldives
 Lower house: House of Commons of Maldives

Judicial branch of the government of Maldives 

Court system of Maldives

Foreign relations of Maldives 

Foreign relations of Maldives
 Diplomatic missions in Maldives
 Diplomatic missions of Maldives

International organization membership 
The Republic of Maldives is a member of:

Asian Development Bank (ADB)
Colombo Plan (CP)
Commonwealth of Nations
Food and Agriculture Organization (FAO)
Group of 77 (G77)
International Bank for Reconstruction and Development (IBRD)
International Civil Aviation Organization (ICAO)
International Criminal Police Organization (Interpol)
International Development Association (IDA)
International Finance Corporation (IFC)
International Fund for Agricultural Development (IFAD)
International Maritime Organization (IMO)
International Monetary Fund (IMF)
International Olympic Committee (IOC)
International Telecommunication Union (ITU)
Inter-Parliamentary Union (IPU)
Islamic Development Bank (IDB)
Multilateral Investment Guarantee Agency (MIGA)

Non-aligned Movement (NAM)
Organisation of Islamic Cooperation (OIC)
Organisation for the Prohibition of Chemical Weapons (OPCW)
South Asia Co-operative Environment Programme (SACEP)
South Asian Association for Regional Cooperation (SAARC)
United Nations (UN)
United Nations Conference on Trade and Development (UNCTAD)
United Nations Educational, Scientific, and Cultural Organization (UNESCO)
United Nations Industrial Development Organization (UNIDO)
Universal Postal Union (UPU)
World Customs Organization (WCO)
World Federation of Trade Unions (WFTU)
World Health Organization (WHO)
World Intellectual Property Organization (WIPO)
World Meteorological Organization (WMO)
World Tourism Organization (UNWTO)
World Trade Organization (WTO)

Law and order in Maldives 

Law of Maldives
 Constitution of Maldives
 Crime in Maldives
 Human rights in Maldives
 LGBT rights in Maldives
 Law enforcement in Maldives

Military of Maldives 

Military of Maldives
 Command
 Commander-in-chief:
 Forces
 Army of Maldives
 Special Forces (Maldives)

History of Maldives 

History of Maldives

Culture of Maldives 

Culture of Maldives
 Cuisine of Maldives
 Folklore of the Maldives
 Languages of Maldives
 National symbols of Maldives
 Coat of arms of Maldives
 Flag of Maldives
 National anthem of Maldives
 Religion in Maldives
 Roman Catholicism in Maldives
 Islam in Maldives
 World Heritage Sites in Maldives: None

Art in Maldives 

 Music of Maldives

Sports in Maldives 

Sports in Maldives
 Football in Maldives
 Maldives at the Olympics

Economy and infrastructure of Maldives 

Economy of Maldives
 Economic rank, by nominal GDP (2007): 165th (one hundred and sixty fifth)
 Communications in Maldives
 Companies of Maldives
Currency of Maldives: Rufiyaa
ISO 4217: MVR
 Maldives Stock Exchange
 Media in Maledives
 Newspapers in the Maldives
 Tourism in Maldives
 Visa policy of Maldives
 Transport in Maldives
 Airports in Maldives

Education in Maldives 

Education in Maldives

See also 

Maldives

List of international rankings
List of Maldives-related topics
Member state of the Commonwealth of Nations
Member state of the United Nations
Outline of Asia
Outline of geography

References

External links 

 Government
The President's Office - Republic of Maldives
  Information Ministry

 Maps
 Google Maps satellite image of the Maldives
 WikiMapia.org annotated map of the Maldives
 Maps of the Maldivian Atolls

 Overviews and Data
 CIA World Fact Book on Maldives
 

 History and Culture
 Anthropologic, Ethnographic and Ethnologic information about the Maldives
 MaldivesCulture.com Single source of Maldives history in English translated from the Official 'Thareehk'(History) documentation & more

Maldives